Threatin is an American rock band from Los Angeles. Founded by Jered Threatin, real name Jered Eames, the band gained notoriety in November 2018 for a European tour in which it played to mostly empty venues. Threatin has been labelled a "fake band" by the music press and described as a vanity project of its founder. Rolling Stone also referred to Threatin as a "great heavy metal hoax".

History

Background
Jered Eames was born in Moberly, Missouri. He formed the black metal band Saetith there with his older brother Scott. Following the break up of Saetith and a brief period with Abigail Williams, he moved to California in 2012 and began the band Threatin as a solo project, for which he adopted the name Jered Threatin. In 2015, Threatin released a single, "Living Is Dying". In 2017, the album Breaking the World was released, with Jered Threatin performing all instruments.

2018 tour incident

In November 2018, Threatin was booked to tour the United Kingdom having informed venues they had sold hundreds of tickets and had paid the hire fee before each gig. However, the tour achieved widespread news coverage when it became known that the shows had been played to empty rooms. The Camden Underworld in London had been told that 291 advance tickets had been sold, but only three people attended; similarly, 180 tickets had supposedly been sold for the Exchange in Bristol but the band played to an "empty room".

Stories of empty venues began to break on social media before being picked up by MetalSucks, which initially published an exposé on November 9, 2018. MetalSucks investigated further, identifying Threatin as Eames and documenting his internet presence, including extensive fake record labels, booking companies, and management companies, all of which were registered to the same GoDaddy account. It was also discovered that the 38,000 likes on the band's Facebook page had been bought. The story was subsequently picked up by music publications such as NME, and then by the mainstream press.

On November 11, Threatin's backing guitarist Joe Prunera and drummer Dane Davis left the band midway through the tour. Davis stated that bassist Gavin Carney was unable to quit the band as he could not afford a plane ticket home from Europe. Carney has stated he would be happy to work with Threatin again, although Threatin called himself "a solo artist, not a band. The session live musicians were hired solely for the purposes of this tour. There was never any intention of them touring in the future."

On November 14, Threatin issued a statement reading, "What is Fake News? I turned an empty room into an international headline. If you are reading this, you are part of the illusion." Metal Injection commented that despite the publicity "we have seen no significant gains in Threatin's social media followings or their streaming numbers." Scott Eames released a statement to distance himself from his brother's actions. He added that, "While [Jered] may try to spin all this as an elaborate hoax of sorts, I can assure you, knowing my brother, that this indeed was a failed attempt at entering the music industry." In December, Threatin admitted the hoax and claimed to have sent emails to reporters exposing the hoax on the first day of the tour to build the controversy. This claim was later proved false by the BBC, who found the emails in question were sent after the failure of the tour.

In May 2019 it was revealed that Joe Prunera, Dane Davis, and Davis's mother Debra had all sued Eames and his business partner for costs accrued during the UK tour. Neither defendant attended the hearings, as Prunera was awarded $10,000 plus $250 in court fees, Dane Davis was awarded $3,975.29, and Debra Davis was awarded $4,035.66. Notices sent to Eames regarding the judgement were returned to the court, and the court had reportedly been unable to contact him.

Return to live performance

Jered Threatin returned to play the Camden Underworld in London on November 1, 2019. Prior to the event, manager Jon Vyner stated: "We'll probably promote it in-house. Last time there was no one to promote him—because he had no fans at the time. Now he does." Threatin's return show to the Camden Underworld featured robotic mannequins dressed in T-shirts with "Fake Band" printed on them. Threatin regularly handed his microphone to one of the mannequins to "sing" his lyrics on a backing track. Other stage spectacles included Threatin pretending to be fellated by a blow-up doll wearing a BBC News T-shirt, before ending the show by smashing his guitar. A maximum of 60 people were reported to have attended, with a significant number leaving before the end of the 45-minute show.

Members
Current members
Jered Threatin – all vocals and instruments (2012–present)

Former touring musicians
Gavin Carney – bass guitar (2018)
Joe Prunera – guitar (2018)
Dane Davis – drums (2018)

Discography
 Breaking the World (2017)

References

External links

Confidence tricks
Musical groups established in 2012
2012 establishments in California
Musical groups from Los Angeles
Glam metal musical groups from California
Heavy metal musical groups from California
One-man bands
Musical hoaxes